Camp Quedlinburg was a prisoner-of-war camp located 2 kilometers north of Quedlinburg, Germany, during the First World War. It was built in September 1914.  From 1914 to 1922, the camp housed 12,000 to 18,000 prisoners of war on average. Around 27,000 people lived in the neighbouring city of Quedlinburg at that time. There were three official branch offices in Staßfurt,  and Aschersleben as well as other unofficial offices in Egeln, Halberstadt, Schönebeck, Groß Rodensleben, Schadeleben and Hedersleben.

Camp
The camp was built on 104 hectares with 48 barracks for the prisoners. Barbed wire fences were erected to prevent escape attempts. In eight double rows there were three barracks on each side of the gable. To the northeast there were eight barracks for the guards and on the western side of Ditfurter Weg a number of large administrative buildings. Northwest of the camp were three isolated sick shelters. Guard towers with machine guns stood in the middle of each long side and at strategically important points. The wooden barracks were about 52 meters long and 12 to 15 meters wide. The interior of the barracks was sparsely furnished. Each prisoner slept in an approximately 80 cm wide 2 metre long wooden bed on straw sacks covered with woollen blankets. The barracks were divided into halves by transverse walls, each heated by an oven in the middle. At the southwest end of a block of six barracks was a kitchen building. 

During the war mainly Russian, French, Belgian and English, since 1917 also Italian soldiers were interned. From the beginning they were used to build up the camp and later as workers in labour detachments, especially in agriculture.
On 9 December 1918 Theodor Cizeck Zeilau (1884-1970), a Captain in the Danish Army, made an inspection visit of the camp at Quedlinburg.

Even after the war it was used as a transit camp. It was not until 1921 that the last Russian prisoners left the camp, whereupon it was burned down. 703 prisoners of war were buried on a special part of the Quedlinburg central cemetery.

Notable prisoners
 W. K. Beaman, Captain 
 W. E. Burrows, Sergeant, 3rd Worcestershire Regiment
 Wallace Roy Crichton, 46th Btn, Private, WIA & Captured Bapaume 11/4/1917-Interned Limburg/Quedlinburg Saxony-repatriated England 7/1/1918 RTA 30/6/1918 
 Norman Cowan (1898–2003)
 Charles Darragh, 47th Battalion Private, Interned Quedlinburg- Arrived England admitted to 2nd London General Hospital 24/12/1918 
 Harry	Nutma Derrick, 37th Btn, Private, WIA & Captured-Died 12/11/1918 at Quedlinburg Hospital- buried Niederzwehren Cemetery Cassel 
 John Gray Donn, 
 Arthur Henry Fitt (1890–1954), <ref>Peter Cox: Arthur Henry Fitt (1890 -1954) and his war (pdf, 2018, 19 December)</ref>
 Leonard Foust Hann, 33rd Battalion Private, WIA & Captured 7/5/1918-Interned Sachsen/Quedlinburg-arrived England admitted to King George Hospital 31/8/1918
 Norman Elliott Lampe, 32nd Btn Private, WIA & Captured Fromelles 20/7/1916-Interned Stendal/Quedlinburg-repatriated Ripon 12/1/1919
 Frederick R. Lavender (died 1918), D Bty. 250th Bde, Royal Field Artillery
 Jacques Messiant 
 Reginald Charles Prow, 20th Btn, Sergeant, WIA & Captured Mount St Quentin 31/8/1918-Interned Quedlinburg-repatriated Ripon 30/12/1918
 Fred Purvis (1894–1918), Gunner, 1/5th battalion, the Northumbrian Fusiliers
 Théophile Radin (1889–1918)
 Marcel Riegel
 Ernest Simonsen, 47th Btn, Private, WIA & Captured 5/4/1918-Interned Quedlinburg-repatriated Ripon 30/12/1918
 Henry Strachan (1898–1918), 8th Battalion Durham Light InfantryHenry Strachan on Camp-de-Quedlinburg.fr
 Aloïs Verleye

See also
 World War I prisoners of war in Germany
 List of prisoner-of-war camps in Germany

References

Bibliography
 Photographs 
 Pictures from the Camp Quedlinburg
Memoirs
 
 Richard Charles Patrick: A Minute's Peace: Finding my WWI Grandfather. 2020. .

Secondary works
 , 
 Dorothy Jones: Quedlinburg men’s camp – Christmas in Denmark''. Revised 16.1.2018.

External links

 Quedlinburg: German Empire POW Camp during the Great War
 Find of the month August: A POW Camp in the First World War
 The Quedlinburg POW Camp Orchestra
 List of PoW from Red Cross
  Site on the Quedlinburg camp

German Empire in World War I
Prisoner-of-war camps in Germany
World War I prisoner-of-war camps
World War I sites in Germany